Daniele Greco (born 27 April 1988) is an Italian footballer who plays as a midfielder.

Club career
Born in Rome, capital of Italy (and Lazio region), Greco started his career at one of the two Serie A team of Rome – S.S. Lazio. He was selected to various youth level of the national team, until he left the club in mid-2007. Greco, along with Lucas Correa, Matteo Merini and Simone Santarelli, were signed by Gallipoli in late July. Greco failed to play any game in 2007–08 Serie C1 until he left for Sassuolo in January 2008. He won both Serie C1 (group A) and Supercoppa di Serie C1 with Sassuolo. However, he only played once in the league and did not play in the grand final (super cup) between the two group winner.

Sorrento
Greco left for another third division club Sorrento in 2008–09 Lega Pro Prima Divisione in co-ownership deal. In June 2009 Lazio gave up the remain 50% registration rights for free after he only played 5 times. In 2009–10 Lega Pro Prima Divisione Greco played 20 times, including 14 starts. However Greco left Sorrento for Paganese of the same group. Greco only played 10 times in 2010–11 Lega Pro Prima Divisione, all in the first half. Paganese relegated at the end of season as the last and Sorrento finished as the runner-up of the league (originally the third before match-fixing scandal) and losing semi-finalists of promotion playoffs.

Greco was excluded from Sorrento's plan (aiming for promotion) again in 2011–12 season. He only played once before left on loan to fourth division club Melfi. He was the second eldest player of the club at age 23, only 1 year younger than another mid-season signing Giancarlo Improta. Greco only made 4 starts from his 11 appearances. Melfi successfully avoided relegation with the young squad and Sorrento failed to promote again as losing semi-finalists.

Pro Patria
On 31 August 2012 he left for Pro Patria.

International career
Greco capped 4 times for the Italy U15 team in June 2003. He also capped 4 times for the same U17 feeder team in the whole 2003–04 season. He played 7 friendlies for Italy national under-17 football team and played all 4 matches in 2005 UEFA European Under-17 Football Championship. The team finished as the third. The team also went to 2005 FIFA U-17 World Championship. The club finished as the third of Group C and failed to quality to quarter-finals.

Greco also played twice in 2007 UEFA European Under-19 Football Championship elite qualification. The team had a bye to the elite qualification but failed to qualify to the finals.

His last cap was for Italy national under-20 football team in 2007–08 Four Nations Tournament on 14 November 2007.

References

External links
 Football.it Profile 
 FIGC 
 

Italian footballers
S.S. Lazio players
A.S.D. Gallipoli Football 1909 players
U.S. Sassuolo Calcio players
A.S.D. Sorrento players
Paganese Calcio 1926 players
A.S. Melfi players
Aurora Pro Patria 1919 players
Ascoli Calcio 1898 F.C. players
Association football midfielders
Footballers from Rome
1988 births
Living people